Harlem Airport  is a public use airport located three nautical miles (6 km) north of the central business district of Harlem, a city in Blaine County, Montana, United States. It is owned by the Blaine County and the City of Harlem. This airport is included in the National Plan of Integrated Airport Systems for 2011–2015, which categorized it as a general aviation facility.

Facilities and aircraft 
Harlem Airport covers an area of 237 acres (96 ha) at an elevation of 2,643 feet (806 m) above mean sea level. It has two runways: 11/29 is 4,100 by 75 feet (1,250 x 23 m) with an asphalt surface and 15/33 is 1,942 by 120 feet (592 x 37 m) with a turf surface.

For the 12-month period ending July 20, 2012, the airport had 3,850 general aviation aircraft operations, an average of 10 per day. At that time there were five single-engine aircraft based at this airport.

See also 
 List of airports in Montana

References

External links 
 Aerial image as of September 1997 from USGS The National Map
 

Airports in Montana
Transportation in Blaine County, Montana
Buildings and structures in Blaine County, Montana